Ahmed Asmat Abdel-Meguid (‎; 22 March 1923 – 21 December 2013) was an Egyptian diplomat. He served as the Foreign Minister of Egypt between 1984 and 1991, and as the Secretary-General of the Arab League from 1991 until 2001.

Biography
Born in Alexandria in March 1923,  Abdel Meguid received a law degree from Alexandria University in 1944 before going on to obtain a doctorate of international law from the University of Paris in 1947. He joined the Egyptian foreign ministry in 1950 and worked in several departments, notably the British and French sections. In 1967 he was appointed as Chairman of the State Information Service, a post he held for a year. He became ambassador to France in 1970, deputy foreign minister in 1970, and Egypt's high representative to the United Nations in 1972. He served in that position until 1983, and was then foreign minister from 1984 to 1991, when he was elected secretary-general of the Arab League.

He died in Cairo on 21 December 2013, at the age of 90.

References

External links

1923 births
2013 deaths
Alexandria University alumni
University of Paris alumni
20th-century Egyptian diplomats
Foreign ministers of Egypt
Secretaries General of the Arab League
Ambassadors of Egypt to France
Permanent Representatives of Egypt to the United Nations
Knights Grand Cross of the Order of Isabella the Catholic
Politicians from Alexandria